3005 or variant, may refer to:

In general
 A.D. 3005, a year in the 4th millennium CE
 3005 BC, a year in the 4th millennium BCE
 3005, a number in the 3000 (number) range

Roads numbered 3005
 Kentucky Route 3005, a state highway
 Louisiana Highway 3005, a state highway
 Texas Farm to Market Road 3005, a state highway
 A3005 road (Great Britain)

Ships with pennant number 3005
 , a U.S. Navy cargoship
 , a WWI U.S. Navy transport
 , a WWII Kriegsmarine submarine
 , several logistics ships of the British Royal Navy

Other uses
 3005 Pervictoralex, an asteroid in the Asteroid Belt, the 3005th asteroid registered
 "3005" (song), a 2013 song by Childish Gambino off the album Because the Internet

See also

 
 305 (disambiguation)